"My Hang-Up Is You" is a 1972 single by Freddie Hart and the Heartbeats.  "My Hang-Up Is You" was Hart's second number one on the U.S. country singles chart. The single stayed at number one for six weeks and spent a total of eighteen weeks on the chart.

Chart performance

References 
 

1972 singles
Freddie Hart songs
Billboard Hot Country Songs number-one singles of the year
Songs written by Freddie Hart
Capitol Records singles